The Minister of Women's Affairs is a cabinet-level position in the Gambia, typically held at the same time as another cabinet position. The ministry was created by Yahya Jammeh, as head of the Armed Forces Provisional Ruling Council, in July 1996, and the position has only ever had two holders: Jammeh's Vice-President, Isatou Njie-Saidy, and Adama Barrow's acting Vice-President, Fatoumata Tambajang. Njie-Saidy had formerly served as executive secretary of the National Women's Bureau under Dawda Jawara, whereas Tambajang had been chair of the Gambia National Women's Council under Jawara.

List of Ministers of Women's Affairs, 1996–present

References

Lists of government ministers of the Gambia
Women's ministries
Women in the Gambia